Ellen Clayton may refer to:

Ellen Wright Clayton, American professor of genetics
Ellen Creathorne Clayton, author and artist